The Outer London Defence Ring was a defensive ring built around London during the early part of the Second World War. It was intended as a defence against a German invasion, and was part of a national network of similar "Stop Lines".

In June 1940 under the direction of General Edmund Ironside, concentric rings of anti-tank defences and pillboxes were constructed in and around London. They comprised: The London Inner Keep, London Stop Line Inner (Line C), London Stop Line Central (Line B) and London Stop Line Outer (Line A). The Outer London Ring was the strongest and best developed of these, mainly because it could be constructed in open countryside. Work on all the lines was halted weeks later by Ironside's successor, General Alan Brooke, who favoured mobile warfare above static defence.

North of London the ring followed a path similar to the route now taken by the M25 motorway, from Watford, following the River Colne, through Potters Bar, Cuffley, Nazeing, then running south through Epping Forest, Loughton and Chigwell. 

Many pillboxes and anti-tank traps are still visible at points along the ring, but in the majority of places the ditch is no longer visible, covered by the M25 or London suburbs.

See also
Fortifications of London
British anti-invasion preparations of World War II
GHQ Line
Taunton Stop Line
Coquet Stop Line
London Defence Positions - a Victorian approach to the same problem.
Traffic and Environmental Zone, the "ring of steel" erected in the 1990s as a defence against terrorism.

External links
Essex County Council - Unlocking Essex's Past: Outer London Defence Ring
Essex County Council - Unlocking Essex's Past: Anti-Tank Ditch and Earthwork in Epping Forest
UK Pillboxes and Invasion Defence Remains.
Remains of defences in Hertfordshire

References

British World War II defensive lines
Fortifications of London
Defence of London
Fortification lines